Salem Spartans, is a cricket team representing Salem district in the Tamil Nadu Cricket Association T20 League tournament, Tamil Nadu Premier League (TNPL). The team is owned by Vivo Chennai south distributor Selvakumar M.

This is the highest brand in TNPL.

Team history 
In 2019 franchise Albert Tuti Patriots removed co-owners of a franchise. So in 2020 the team Tuti Patriots was renamed as Salem Spartans  due to the change of ownership from Thoothukodi sports and private entertainment LTD to M.Selvakumar ( VIVO South Chennai distributor).

Team identity 

The team play in a jersey that grades from yellow through orange to red. The strip's trousers are black.

The team's anthem song is starting with the term Vanakkam Da Mapla (Tamil: வணக்கம் டா மாப்ள சேலத்தில இருந்து). The lyrics were also written by people from the areas around Salem City. The team hashtag is #VanakkamDaMapla, which is used in the anthem.

The term Spartans refers to the people who are always simple, it means the people's from Salem is always simple. Logo of the franchise Salem Spartans is also designed like a simple men take efforts to defend him from predators . Like wise the franchise is also simple but it will take much more efforts to defend the team from opponents and for the victory.

Current squad 
 Players with international caps are listed in bold.
 Players with state caps are listed in italic.

Support staff

Statistics

Seasons 
Salem Spartans is playing their inaugural season in 2021 .

2022

2021

Sponsors and kit manufacturers

References

External links
 TNPL Official Page

Tamil Nadu Premier League